RD (Ruby Document) is a lightweight markup language
for writing Ruby-related documents.
It can be embedded in Ruby source code.

RD is a traditional format.
In modern Ruby, developers tend to write documents in RDoc instead of RD.

Use 

Originally, most documentation in the Ruby world, including for Ruby itself, had been written in RD. Then in 2002, much of it was converted to RDoc format. Although, the Japanese version of the Ruby Reference Manual still remains in RD format.

RD is designed to be written by hand and easily read in its raw form. Most end-users however experience it after it has been converted into HTML or man pages.

RD can be embedded in Ruby code, and pure RD files usually have the extension .rd.

Sample RD document 

This document is syntactically correct RD,
which attempts to follow the major conventions on section naming as well.

See also
 Markdown
 Plain Old Documentation

External links
 RDtool - Framework to translate RD document into other formats.
 rd-draft.rd - full description of RD markup languard (in RD format)
 rd-draft.html - full description of RD markup language (converted to HTML)

Lightweight markup languages